Injong is the temple name used for several monarchs of Korea, derived from the Chinese equivalent Rénzōng. It may refer to:

Injong of Goryeo (1109–1146, reigned 1122–1146), king of Goryeo
Injong of Joseon (1515–1545, reigned 1544–1545), king of Joseon

See also
Renzong (disambiguation), Chinese equivalent
Nhân Tông (disambiguation), Vietnamese equivalent

Temple name disambiguation pages